The 2014 Major League Baseball postseason was the playoff tournament of Major League Baseball for the 2014 season. The winners of the League Division Series would move on to the League Championship Series to determine the pennant winners that face each other in the World Series.

In the American League, the Detroit Tigers made their fourth straight postseason appearance, the Oakland Athletics made their third straight appearance, the Los Angeles Angels of Anaheim made their first postseason appearance since 2009, the Baltimore Orioles returned for the second time in three years, and the Kansas City Royals ended almost three decades of futility by returning to the postseason for the first time since 1985.

In the National League, the St. Louis Cardinals made their fourth straight postseason appearance, the Los Angeles Dodgers and Pittsburgh Pirates made their second straight appearance, the Washington Nationals returned for the second time in three years, and the San Francisco Giants made their third postseason appearance in the past five years.

2014 marks the most recent postseason appearances for both the Tigers and Angels, who both now share the longest active postseason droughts in the majors.

The postseason began on September 30, and ended on October 29, with the Giants narrowly defeating the Royals in seven games in the 2014 World Series. It was the Giants' eighth title in franchise history.

Playoff seeds
The following teams qualified for the postseason:

American League
 Los Angeles Angels of Anaheim – AL West champions, 98–64
 Baltimore Orioles – AL East champions, 96–66
 Detroit Tigers – AL Central champions, 90–72
 Kansas City Royals – 89–73
 Oakland Athletics – 88–74

National League
 Washington Nationals – NL East champions, 96–66
 Los Angeles Dodgers – NL West champions, 94–68
 St. Louis Cardinals – NL Central champions, 90–72
 Pittsburgh Pirates – 88–74 (4–2 head-to-head record vs. SF)
 San Francisco Giants – 88–74 (4–2 head-to-head record vs. PIT)

Playoff bracket

American League Wild Card

(4) Kansas City Royals vs. (5) Oakland Athletics 

This was the first postseason meeting between these teams since the 1981 ALDS, which the Athletics won in a sweep. The Athletics went up 7-3 going into the eighth inning, until the Royals rallied in the bottom of the eighth and ninth innings, scoring 4 runs to send the game into extra innings. In the 12th inning, the Athletics again took the lead and were two outs away from reaching the ALDS, but the lead wouldn't hold and the Royals scored two runs to secure the victory and advance to the ALDS.

National League Wild Card

(4) Pittsburgh Pirates vs. (5) San Francisco Giants 

This was the first postseason meeting between the Giants and Pirates since the 1971 NLCS, which the Pirates won in four games en route to a World Series title. The Giants shut out the Pirates 8-0 and advanced to the NLDS.

The Pirates returned to the postseason again the next year, but fell in the Wild Card game again to the Chicago Cubs.

American League Division Series

(1) Los Angeles Angels of Anaheim vs. (4) Kansas City Royals 

The Royals unexpectedly swept the top-seeded Angels to return to the ALCS for the first time since 1985. In Anaheim, the Royals stole Games 1 and 2 on the road after two 11-inning contests to go up 2-0 in the series headed to Kansas City. In Game 3, the Royals blew out the Angels to advance to the ALCS.

As of 2022, this is the last postseason appearance by the Angels, who now hold the longest postseason appearance drought in the MLB alongside the Detroit Tigers.

(2) Baltimore Orioles vs. (3) Detroit Tigers

The Orioles handily swept the Tigers to advance to the ALCS for the first time since 1997. In Game 1, the Orioles blew out the Tigers by 9 runs. In Game 2, the Tigers possessed a 6-3 lead going into the bottom of the eighth, however the Orioles had the bases loaded for former Tiger Delmon Young, who unloaded the bases with a go-ahead three-run double to put the Orioles in the lead for good. Baltimore's Zack Britton secured the win for the Orioles in the top of the ninth, and the O's were now up 2-0 in the series headed to Detroit. In Game 3, the Orioles held off a late rally by the Tigers to complete the sweep and advance to the ALCS, handing the Tigers their first ever defeat in the ALDS. In their previous four appearances, they advanced to the ALCS each time.

To date, this is the last postseason appearance by the Tigers, and with the Seattle Mariners and Philadelphia Phillies ending their postseason appearance droughts in 2022, the Tigers are now in possession of the longest postseason appearance drought in the MLB, along with the Angels. It is also the most recent playoff series win by the Orioles.

National League Division Series

(1) Washington Nationals vs. (5) San Francisco Giants 

The Giants defeated the Nationals in four games to reach the NLCS for the third time in five years.

In Game 1, the Giants held off a late rally by the Nationals. Game 2 remained tied at one run each going into the top of the eighteenth inning, when San Francisco's Brandon Belt cracked a solo home run to put the Giants in the lead for good. They then closed out the game in the bottom of the inning, putting the Giants up 2-0 in the series going to San Francisco. Game 3 was a pitcher's duel between Washington's Doug Fister and San Francisco's Madison Bumgarner, which Fister ended up winning as the Nationals won 4-1 to avoid a sweep, handing Bumgarner his only loss of the entire postseason. However, the Giants would close out the series in Game 4 with a 3-2 victory. 

The Nationals would return to the postseason in 2016, where they were knocked out by the Los Angeles Dodgers in five games again in the NLDS.

(2) Los Angeles Dodgers vs. (3) St. Louis Cardinals 

This was the fifth postseason meeting between the Cardinals and Dodgers. The Cardinals again defeated the Dodgers to advance to the NLCS for the fourth year in a row.

The Cardinals prevailed in a Game 1 slugfest, 10-9, while the Dodgers evened the series with a 4-3 win in Game 2. John Lackey helped lead the Cardinals to victory in Game 3, and prevailed against Clayton Kershaw on three-days rest in Game 4 to close out the series.

American League Championship Series

(2) Baltimore Orioles vs (4) Kansas City Royals 

*: postponed from October 13 due to rain

The Royals upset the Orioles in a sweep to return to the World Series for the first time since 1985. This improved the Royals' postseason record to 8–0, surpassing the record set by the 1976 Cincinnati Reds, who went 7–0.

The Royals stole Game 1 on the road with a 3-1 run in the tenth inning. In Game 2, Terrance Gore, Alcides Escobar, and Lorenzo Cain helped the Royals pull away from the Orioles in the top of the ninth to go up 2-0 in the series headed to Kansas City. The Royals' pitching limited the Orioles to one run scored in Games 3 and 4, as they prevailed by identical 2-1 scores to secure the pennant.

As of 2022, this is the last time the Orioles appeared in the ALCS. The Royals would win the AL pennant again the next year, defeating the Toronto Blue Jays in six games en route to a World Series title.

National League Championship Series

(3) St. Louis Cardinals vs (5) San Francisco Giants 

This was the fourth postseason meeting between the Cardinals and Giants (1987, 2002, 2012). The Giants defeated the defending National League champion Cardinals in five quick games to return to the World Series for the third time in five years (in the process denying a rematch of the 1985 World Series).

Madison Bumgarner and Sergio Romo helped the Giants shutout the Cardinals in Game 1. In Game 2, with the game tied at four runs each, St. Louis' Kolten Wong evened the series for the Cardinals with a walk-off home run in the bottom of the ninth. In San Francisco for Game 3, the Giants prevailed in extra innings to go up 2-1 in the series. In Game 4, the Cardinals held a 4-3 lead going into the bottom of the sixth, until the Giants scored three unanswered runs to take the lead for good and go up 3-1 in the series. Game 5 remained tied at three going into the bottom of the ninth, until San Francisco's Travis Ishikawa won the pennant for the Giants with a walk-off three-run home run.

With the win, the Giants became the first fifth-seeded team to reach the World Series. As of 2022, this is the last time the Giants won the NL pennant. The Cardinals returned to the NLCS in 2019, but they would lose to the Washington Nationals in a sweep.

2014 World Series

(AL4) Kansas City Royals vs. (NL5) San Francisco Giants 

This was the sixth World Series in which the Giants faced a team from the American League Central Division (1917, 1924, 1933, 1954, 2012), as well as the first World Series since 2002 to feature two Wild Card teams. The Giants narrowly defeated the Royals in seven games to win their third title in five years, capping off a dynasty and becoming the lowest seeded team in postseason history to win a World Series.

Both teams split the first two games in Kansas City with blowout victories. When the series moved to San Francisco, the Royals took a 2-1 series lead with a 3-2 victory in Game 3, marking the first time since 2002 that the Giants found themselves trailing in the World Series. The Giants blew out the Royals in Game 4 to even the series, and took Game 5 in a 5-0 shutout where San Francisco's Madison Bumgarner became the first pitcher to record a complete game shutout in the World Series since 2003. The Giants were now one win away from completing a dynasty. When the series moved back to Kansas City for Game 6, the Royals blew out the Giants in a 10-0 shutout thanks to a stellar pitching performance by Yordano Ventura, handing the Giants their most lopsided defeat in the Fall Classic since Game 5 of the 1951 World Series. 

Game 7 was the most memorable contest of the series. Tim Hudson started for the Giants and lasted just over an inning, as he allowed two runs before giving way to veteran southpaw Jeremy Affeldt. The game was tied at two going into the top of the fourth inning, until the Giants scored one run to take the lead for good. Then, Giants' manager Bruce Bochy pulled Affeldt in favor of Bumgarner, who was only on two games rest. Bumgarner shut out the Royals' offense the rest of the game, and while the Royals had a runner on third in the bottom of the ninth, the Giants prevailed due to a pop-up foul ball by Kansas City's Salvador Perez, which was caught by Pablo Sandoval to clinch the title for the Giants.

It was the Giants' eighth World Series title in franchise history. The Giants became the first team since the Pittsburgh Pirates in 1979 to win a World Series Game 7 on the road, as well as the first fifth-seeded team to win the World Series. With the win, the Giants' record in the World Series against AL Central teams improved to 4–2, and they have beaten every AL Central team in the World Series except the Chicago White Sox.

To date, this is the Giants' most recent World Series win and appearance. The Giants returned to the postseason in 2016 in the hope of keeping their dynasty alive, but they would fall to the eventual champion Chicago Cubs in the NLDS. The Royals returned to the World Series the next year, defeating the New York Mets in five games to end their three-decade long World Series drought.

References

External links
 League Baseball Standings & Expanded Standings - 2014

 
Major League Baseball postseason